Members only may refer to:

Members only club
Members Only (band), an American jazz band
Members Only (hip hop collective), a music collective 
Members Only (fashion brand)
"Members Only" (The Sopranos), an episode of The Sopranos
"Members Only" (That's So Raven), an episode of That's So Raven
"Members Only" (South Park), an episode from the 20th season of the animated television series South Park
Members Only (TV series), an unaired ABC television series
Members-only unionism

See also
For Members Only, an album by American jazz organist Shirley Scott 

English phrases